Jim Aiken (1932 – 27 February 2007) was a concert promoter responsible for bringing many international acts to perform concerts in Ireland through his company Aiken Promotions, he was responsible for many big gigs in Ireland such as U2 at Croke Park, and concerts at Slane Castle such as Bruce Springsteen and Queen.

Aiken was from Jonesborough in County Armagh and played Gaelic football for the county. He spent four years in Maynooth College studying for the priesthood but instead went on to become a teacher of physics and maths at Harding Street school in Belfast.

Jim Aiken died after suffering from cancer on 27 February 2007 at his home in Belfast. He is survived by his wife Anne, five children (Peter, Claire, Susan, Cathy, Joan) and 13 grandchildren.

References

1932 births
2007 deaths
Alumni of St Patrick's College, Maynooth
People from County Armagh
Music promoters